The Schweizer SGM 2-37 is a two-place, side-by-side, fixed gear, low wing motor glider.

A total of twelve were produced between 1982 and 1988, including nine for the United States Air Force Academy, which designated it the TG-7A. The TG-7A was retired from USAFA service in April 2003.

The basic airframe was later developed into the SA 2-37A and B covert surveillance aircraft.

Development
Schweizer had flown a Schweizer SGU 1-19 as a motor glider in 1946 without putting the design into production. In 1958 the company carried out a design study of a powered aircraft using the wings and tail of the 1-26 designated as the Schweizer SA 1-30, but after some test flying and modification it was not put into production. A two-seat version of the 1-30, the Schweizer SA 2-31 was completed in 1960 but not put into production due to competition in the light aircraft market. Both the 1-30 and 2-31 were designed as regular light aircraft and no further motorgliders were built by the company until 1982.

The SGM 2-37 was designed at the request of the USAF for use at USAFA, in both the powered and glider trainer role.

To save both money and development time the aircraft used a number of existing aircraft components:

 Nose, cowling, and engine installation adapted from the Piper PA-38 Tomahawk
 Tail from the Schweizer SGS 2-32

The design was intended to be available as a civil aircraft as well as a military aircraft.

The aircraft is of all-metal aluminum monocoque construction. The engine cowling is made from fiberglass and plastics are employed in some of the nonstructural components.

The 2-37 features a  baggage compartment behind the side-by-side seating. The aircraft does not have flaps, but instead has top-and-bottom wing-mounted balanced divebrakes, similar to other Schweizer glider designs.

Performance includes a cruise speed of 114 mph while burning 4 US gal per hour with the O-235 engine. The 17.9 aspect ratio wing provides a glide ratio of 28:1 with the propeller feathered, and a minimum sink speed of 3.16 feet/sec (0.96 m/s). The USAF Technical Orders indicate a glide ratio of between 19.3:1 and 19.7:1.

The SGS 2-37 was marketed by the company as being suitable for the following roles:
Sailplane trainer
Powered aircraft trainer
Glider towplane (with larger horsepower engine option)
Private touring aircraft
Surveillance
Aerial Inspection

The 2-37 was later developed into the SA 3-38, known in military service as the Schweizer RU-38 Twin Condor.

Certification
The SGM 2-37 was certified by the Federal Aviation Administration under type certificate G1NE on 22 March 1983. The 2-37 type certificate is currently held by K & L Soaring of Cayuta, New York. K & L Soaring now provides all parts and support for the Schweizer line of sailplanes.

Reception
Soaring, the journal of the Soaring Society of America, described the SGM 2-37 as: "Very versatile, very promising, very expensive". The publication's review noted that the $70,000 base price did not include a feathering propeller, gyro instruments, wheel fairings, long range fuel tanks, or other optional extras.

Operational history
Examples of the TG-7 were used by the US Army from 1985 on covert surveillance duties under the Grisly Hunter project. The two aircraft were then transferred to the US Coast Guard by mid 1989, were modified and were re-designated RG-8A. The aircraft were used on coastal patrols from the US Coast Guard base at Miami wearing a grey low visibility color scheme, as shown in the adjacent image taken in 1989.

There were nine aircraft still registered in the US in April 2008. Current owners include the Tuskegee Airmen National Historical Museum and designer Leslie E. Schweizer.

Variants

SGM 2-37
Motor glider for USAF and civil use, 12 completed.
SA 2-37A
The US aircraft register records six SA-2-37As, including four belonging to Vantage Aircraft Leasing. All are in the experimental exhibition category.
SA 2-37B
The aircraft is optimized for covert surveillance missions and carries FLIR and electronic sensors. It has a 500 lb (231 kg) sensor payload in a  fuselage bay. With a fuel capacity of  it can remain on station for up to 12 hours. Gross weight is 4300 lb (1950 kg). The US aircraft registry records four SA 2-37Bs, all owned by Schweizer Aircraft. All are in the experimental Research and Development category.
TG-7A
United States Air Force designation for the SGM 2-37.
RG-8A
In US Coast Guard service the SA 2-37 is designated RG-8A, indicating Glider, Reconnaissance.

Operators

United States Air Force
United States Army
United States Coast Guard

Colombian Air Force

 Mexican Air Force

Specifications (SGM 2-37)

See also

References

1980s United States military trainer aircraft
Schweizer aircraft
Motor gliders
Single-engined tractor aircraft
Low-wing aircraft
Aircraft first flown in 1982